Lennart Bälter (born 3 May 1946) is a Swedish rower. He competed at the 1972 Summer Olympics and the 1976 Summer Olympics.

References

External links
 

1946 births
Living people
Swedish male rowers
Olympic rowers of Sweden
Rowers at the 1972 Summer Olympics
Rowers at the 1976 Summer Olympics
People from Mora Municipality
Sportspeople from Dalarna County